Batul, Bantul, Batul the Great, or Bantul the Great is a popular Bengali comic strip character created by Narayan Debnath. It was inspired by the famous comics character Desperate Dan drawn by Dudley D. Watkins. It first appeared and still appears in a children's magazine called Shuktara and is widely read, not only by children but by adults as well. It has since appeared in comic book format and as an animation series.

Origin
Narayan Debnath's first comic book characters in color were for the comic strip and book Batul The Great. By Debnath's admission, he thought up the idea of the superhero while returning from College Street, Calcutta. He has remarked that the character of Batul was influenced by his friend Manohar Aich, the famous Bengali bodybuilder. The name came to him instantly and he thought up the figure of the protagonist rapidly. Initially, he did not know what he foresaw as a future for Batul and did not give him any superpowers. This character has similarities with Desperate Dan.

When the Bangladesh War of Liberation, also known as the Indo-Pakistani War of 1971 flared up, he was asked by the editors and publishers to add an aura of invincibility. Debnath was reluctant at first because he was worried about legal implications. On assurance, he made Batul a superhero. Bullets began to bounce off of him, much like Superman. Batul was still drawn by Debnath for Shuktara. It has been argued that the historical and cultural significance of Bantul is that he “became a symbol of formidability, a much needed push for the Bengalis in the Bangladesh Liberation War, 1971.”

Theme
The protagonist of the story, Batul, is a superhero, with a well-built body and god-like strength.  He is so strong that he can lift the whole earth, run through a wall breaking it to pieces, kill whales and sharks barehanded, and even missiles cannot pierce his chest. He has a great appetite and sometimes has a whale for his breakfast.  Unlike other heroes, Batul does not wear any attractive attire.  Rather, he is always seen clad in a pink or orange vest and a black shorts.  He is the terror of dacoits and hooligans, and protects the good. Sometimes, Batul's amazing strength is the cause of his downfall. This is especially true when he is trying to operate machinery, since he usually breaks it. Another example, depicted in the panel, shows him trying to ride a bull in a rodeo, but due to his weight, the legs of the bull get embedded in the ground. He is also a detective.

With him stay two mischievous boys viz. Bachhu and Bichchu (also sometimes referred to as Goja গজা and Bhoja ভজা  ), who regularly play truant at school, often conspire with robbers and commit daring crimes like bank robberies. Other characters in the comic strip include Lambakarna, who has long ears and superhuman hearing. Batul's aunt, who cooks food for him; Batul's formidable pet dog Vedo, and a pet ostrich, Uto. He can also ignite flames by rubbing "Uko" on his head.

Animation Voice Artist

See also
 Batul The Great (Animated Tv series)
Handa Bhonda
Nonte Phonte

References

Further reading
 Chatterjee, Sourav. "The Itineraries of a Medium: Bengali Comics, and New Ways of Reading," in Interdisziplinäre Zeitschrift für Südasienforschung (Nr. 5), 2019.
 Chatterjee, Sourav. "Masculinity in the Bengali Comic Strips of the 1960s," in Trajectories of Popular Expression: Forms, Histories, Contexts, Eds. N. Sethi and A. Saha, 2018.
 Chatterjee, Sourav. "“YES SIR!” 50 years of Nationalism and the Indo-Pak War in Narayan Debnath's Bñātul the Great," in The International Journal of Comic Art, Vol. 18, No. 1, Ed. John Lent (Pennsylvania: Spring, 2016).
 Chatterjee, Sourav. "Batul: the Great Disciplinarian," in The International Journal of Comic Art, Vol. 17, No. 2, Ed. John Lent (Pennsylvania: Fall/Winter, 2015).

External links
Read Bantul Comics on the internet
Page on Batul from International Heroes website

Superhero comics
Indian comics characters
Indian comics titles
Indian Bengali comics
Bengali comics
Fictional Bengali people